The Primorye region in the Far Eastern Federal District of the Russian Federation is divided into 22 raions and 12 urban districts . A total of 28 urban and 117 rural communities are subordinate to the raions (as of 2010).

Administrative and municipal divisions

References

Primorsky Krai
Primorsky Krai